Egil Børre Johnsen (born 14 July 1936 in Oslo) is a Norwegian writer.  He was the recipient of the Riksmål Society Literature Prize in 2006.

References

1936 births
Living people
Writers from Oslo
21st-century Norwegian male writers